Back for More is the second studio album by Canadian singer Shawn Desman.

Track listing

Singles
"Sexy" (2003) B-Side "My Mind"
"Let's Go" (2005)
"Red Hair" (2005)
"Man In Me"(2005)

Shawn Desman albums
2005 albums
Juno Award for R&B/Soul Recording of the Year recordings